The 2008 Categoría Primera A season was the 61st season of Colombia's top-flight football league.  This season they have the newcomer from the second division Categoría Primera B, Envigado, and the relegated team of Real Cartagena. The season started on 1 February and ended with the finals on 21 December.

Teams 
18 teams competed this season. Real Cartagena was relegated in the previous season, and were replaced by the 2007 Categoría Primera B champions, Envigado.

Stadia & Locations

Torneo Apertura

Standings

Schedule

Cuadrangular playoffs 

The second phase of the 2008 Apertura Tournament is disputed between the best eight teams in the first phase, which are distributed in two groups of four being divided by odd and even numbers. The winners of each group will advance to the Finals to define a champion.

Group A 

 Source:
Seed=Classification in reg. season; Pts=Points; GP=Games played; W=Wins; D=Draws; L=Losses; GF=Goals Favored; GA=Goals Allowed; GD= Goal Difference

Group B 

 Source:
Seed=Classification in reg. season; Pts=Points; GP=Games played; W=Wins; D=Draws; L=Losses; GF=Goals Favored; GA=Goals Allowed; GD=Goal Difference

Finals

Top goalscorers 

Source:

Torneo Finalización

Standings

Positions by round

Cuadrangular Playoffs 
The second phase of the 2008 Finalizacion takes two groups of four teams, divided by even and odd numbers. It is disputed between the best eight teams in the first phase. The winners of each group will advance to the Finals to define a champion. The first tie-breaking criterion is the team's position in the general standings.

Group A

Group B

Finals

Top goalscorers 

Source:

Overall standings 
Besides the Apertura and Finalizacion champions, the team with the best overall points earned will advance to the 2009 Copa Libertadores Group Stage. Also, the team with the second best overall points will advance to 2009 Copa Sudamericana, along with the 2008 Copa Colombia champions.

 Pts=Points; GP=Games played; W=Wins; D=Draws; L=Losses; GS=Goals scored; GA=Goals against; GD=Goal Difference

Relegation table 
The team with the worst points average from the tournaments 2006-I, 2006-II, 2007-I, 2007-II, 2008-I, and 2008-II, is relegated to the Second Division. At the same time, the team with the second worst points average, will have to play a two-leg promotion playoff with the runner-up team from Second Division, to see which team will be in First Division along with the team that replaces the relegated team.

 Pts=Points; GP=Games played; GS=Goals scored; GA=Goals allowed; GD=Goal Difference; Prom=Relegation percentage

Promotion/relegation playoff 

Envigado wins the playoff, and stays in the Primera Division. Atlético Bucaramanga were replaced with the 2008 Primera B champion, Real Cartagena.

References

External links 
 Copa Mustang Official Page
 Dimayor Official Page

Categoría Primera A seasons
Col
1